The Extraordinary and Plenipotentiary Ambassador of Peru to the Republic of Indonesia is the official representative of the Republic of Peru to the Republic of Indonesia.

The ambassador in Jakarta is also accredited to East Timor and ASEAN.

Both countries established diplomatic relations in 1975. Peru opened its embassy in 1992 and Indonesia opened its embassy in 2002.

List of representatives

See also
List of ambassadors of Peru to the Philippines

References

Indonesia
Peru